Philip Arthur Brignull (born 2 October 1960) is an English former professional footballer. A defender, he made over 150 appearances in the Football League during his career.

Career
An England schoolboy international, Brignull started his career as a youth team player at West Ham United. He played just one game in all competitions for West Ham, as a substitute during a 0–0 draw with Cardiff City in on 11 May 1979, before moving to Bournemouth in August 1981. He was a member of the Bournemouth team which knocked Manchester United out of the FA Cup in January 1984. He played as Bournemouth won the inaugural Associate Members' Cup by beating Hull City in the final. He also played for Wrexham, Cardiff City,  Newport County and Weymouth.

He is the uncle of former Leicestershire cricketer David Brignull.

References

1960 births
Living people
English footballers
Association football defenders
West Ham United F.C. players
AFC Bournemouth players
Wrexham A.F.C. players
Cardiff City F.C. players
Newport County A.F.C. players
English Football League players
Footballers from Stratford, London
Weymouth F.C. players